Artocarpus hirsutus, commonly known as wild jack, is a tropical evergreen tree species that is native to India, primarily in  Kerala, but also in Karnataka, Maharashtra and Tamil Nadu, where it prefers moist, deciduous to partially evergreen woodlands.

The Artocarpus hirsutus grows in altitudes ranging from sea level to an elevation of 1000 m in places with an annual rainfall of 1500 mm or more. They are endemic to the Western Ghats and are found in its evergreen forests. The canopy tree can reach a height of up to 35 m and about 4.5 m in girth.

The tree is prized for its durable timber which is comparable in quality with teak. The timber was used extensively in the construction of ceilings, door frames and furniture in older buildings, especially in Kerala. The famous snake boats of Kerala are often hewn out of the  
Aini's wood. 140 tons of A. hisutus wood from Kerala was used for Tim Severin's ship Sohar, in which he traveled from Muscat to Canton in 1980-81.

Description 
The leaves of this tree are simple and phyllotaxy is alternate. The shape can be described as elliptic or ovate with 10-25 × 5-14 cm size. When it is young it is densely hirsute beneath. The apex of leaf is sub-acute or shortly acuminate, base is rounded or sub-acute, and margins undulate. Ten to twelve pairs  of secondary nerves can be visible and the length of petiole is about 1.5-3 cm.

Its flowers are unisexual, in axillary inflorescences and its fruits are syncarps and very sweet, changing to an orange hue when ripe. Its simple, alternate leaves will ooze latex if broken. It is harvested for its wood.

Fruit 
The ripe fruit of A. hirsutus is eaten after removing the spiny outer skin. The structure of the fruit is similar to that of the much larger jackfruit. The seeds are also edible, usually fried as a snack.

Distribution 
It is a common tree in evergreen and semi-evergreen forests from South Maharashtra to Kanyakumari

Diseases 
The important diseases of Artocarpus hirsutus reported from Southern part of India (Kerala state) are Pink disease (Corticium salmonicolor) & Macrophomina leaf spot (Macrophomina phaseolina).

In Culture
This tree , locally called anjili in Kerala is used to make  Palliyodam, a type of large built and used by Aranmula Parthasarathy Temple in Kerala for the annual water processions of Uthrattathi Jalamela and Valla Sadhya.

Gallery

References

External links 

Thinned saplings
Fruit with foliage
A blog on "Anjili tree of many uses"

hirsutus
Plants described in 1789
Flora of India (region)